Hibbertia helianthemoides is a species of flowering plant in the family Dilleniaceae and is endemic to a small area in the south-west of Western Australia. It is a prostrate to low-lying, spreading to erect, hairy shrub with hairy foliage, linear leaves and yellow flowers with thirteen stamens.

Description
Flowering has been recorded from July to September.

Taxonomy
This species was first formally described in 1849 by Nikolai Turczaninow who gave it the name Candollea helianthemoides in the Bulletin de la Société Impériale des Naturalistes de Moscou from specimens collected by James Drummond. In 1882, Ferdinand von Mueller changed the name to Hibbertia helianthemoides in Systematic Census of Australian Plants. The specific epithet (helianthemoides) means "Helianthemum-like".

Distribution and habitat
Hibbertia helianthemoides grows in woodland and shrubland from near Tenterden to the Stirling Ranges in the south-west of Western Australia.

Conservation status
Hibbertia helianthemoides is classified as "Priority Four" by the Government of Western Australia Department of Parks and Wildlife, meaning that is rare or near threatened.

See also
List of Hibbertia species

References

helianthemoides
Flora of Western Australia
Plants described in 1849
Taxa named by Nikolai Turczaninow